Luka Žorić (born November 5, 1984) is a former Croatian professional basketball player.

Professional career
In March 2011, Žorić received the award for Most Valuable Player of the NLB Adriatic League while playing for KK Zagreb.

On June 9, 2011, Žorić signed a three-year contract with the Spanish team Unicaja Málaga. On July 26, 2013, Žorić signed a three-year contract with Fenerbahçe Ülker. Unicaja received 850,000 euros of buyout from Fenerbahçe, as he was still under contract.

On July 28, 2015, Žorić returned to Croatia and signed with Cedevita for the 2015–16 season.

On August 10, 2016, he signed with Spanish club Baloncesto Sevilla. On November 22, 2016, he parted ways with Sevilla. On January 5, 2017, he returned to his former club Cibona for the rest of the season. On July 8, 2017, he re-signed with Cibona. On December 29, 2018, Žorić signed a contract with Zadar until the end of the season.

In September 2019, Žorić signed with Samobor playing in the second-tier Croatian First League.

Career statistics

Euroleague

|-
| style="text-align:left;"| 2005–06
| style="text-align:left;"| Union Olimpija
| 2 || 0 || 3.0 || .000 || .000 || .000 || .5 || .0 || .0 || .0 || .0 || -2.5
|-
| style="text-align:left;"| 2007–08
| style="text-align:left;"| Cibona
| 4 || 1 || 7.0 || .600 || .000 || .000 || .5 || .0 || .0 || .0 || 1.5 || -.3
|-
| style="text-align:left;"| 2011–12
| style="text-align:left;" rowspan=2| Unicaja
| 16 || 14 || 23.7 || .525 || .000 || .683 || 6.1 || .8 || .5 || .9 || 11.7 || 13.7
|-
| style="text-align:left;"| 2012–13
| 24 || 22 || 23.4 || .562 || .000 || .758 || 5.3 || .8 || .3 || 1.0 || 12.4 || 13.8
|-
| style="text-align:left;"| 2013–14
| style="text-align:left;" rowspan=2| Fenerbahçe
| 24 || 7 || 18.9 || .556 || .000 || .769 || 3.6 || .2 || .2 || .6 || 8.3 || 7.0
|-
| style="text-align:left;"| 2014–15
| 23 || 1 || 13.0 || .542 || .000 || .682 || 2.9 || .4 || .1 || .5 || 5.8 || 6.3
|-
| style="text-align:left;"| 2015–16
| style="text-align:left;"| Cedevita
| 16 || 0 || 13.0 || .438 || .000 || .909 || 2.1 || .6 || .3 || .3 || 5.3 || 3.8
|- class="sortbottom"
| style="text-align:left;"| Career
| style="text-align:left;"|
| 109 || 45 || 17.7 || .537 || .000 || .742 || 3.8 || .5 || .3 || .6 || 8.3 || 8.4

References

External links

Luka Žorić at acb.com
Luka Žorić at euroleague.net
Luka Žorić at fiba.com

1984 births
Living people
ABA League players
Baloncesto Málaga players
Basketball Löwen Braunschweig players
Centers (basketball)
Competitors at the 2009 Mediterranean Games
Croatian expatriate basketball people in Germany
Croatian expatriate basketball people in Spain
Croatian expatriate basketball people in Turkey
Croatian expatriate basketball people in Slovenia
Croatian men's basketball players
Fenerbahçe men's basketball players
KK Cedevita players
KK Cibona players
KK Šibenik players
KK Olimpija players
KK Zabok players
KK Zagreb players
KK Zadar players
Liga ACB players
Mediterranean Games gold medalists for Croatia
Mediterranean Games medalists in basketball
Real Betis Baloncesto players
Basketball players from Zadar
2010 FIBA World Championship players
2014 FIBA Basketball World Cup players
KK Dubrava players
KK Borik Puntamika players